The second series of Merlin, is a British fantasy television series which began on 19 September 2009 and ended on 19 December 2009. Series two regular cast members include Colin Morgan, Bradley James, Katie McGrath, Angel Coulby, Anthony Head, Richard Wilson, and John Hurt as the voice of the Great Dragon. Series two contains thirteen episodes and had 5.77 million viewers for the premiere with 6.64 million viewers for the series finale. Series 2 was the first series to have a two-parter and the only series to have a two-parter mid-series. BBC renewed the show for the third series which premiered on 11 September 2010.

Plot 
Merlin continues to serve Prince Arthur while concealing his magical abilities in a kingdom where they are outlawed. New adventures arise in the form of trolls, witchfinders, Druids, the return of an old friend and Dragonlords. While Merlin continues to ensure Arthur grows into the Once and Future King and Arthur and Gwen start to see each other in a new light, a new threat prepares to come to Camelot and a friend will have to make a choice that will alter the legend...forever.

Cast

Main cast 
 Colin Morgan as Merlin
 Angel Coulby as Gwen
 Bradley James as Arthur
 Katie McGrath as Morgana 
 Anthony Head as Uther Pendragon
 Richard Wilson as Gaius

Recurring 
 John Hurt as the Great Dragon (voice)
 Emilia Fox as Morgause
 Rupert Young as Sir Leon
 Michael Cronin as Geoffrey of Monmouth
 Asa Butterfield as Mordred (Young)

Guest stars 
 Mackenzie Crook as Cedric/Cornelius Sigan
 Adrian Lester as Myror
 Alex Price as "Sir William of Deira"
 Colin Salmon as Aglain
 James Cosmo as Hengist
 Santiago Cabrera as Lancelot
 Sarah Parish as Lady Catrina
 Adam Godley as Jonas
 Charles Dance as Aredian, the witchfinder
 Alice Patten as Ygraine
 Laura Donnelly as Freya
 David Schofield as King Alined
 Georgia Tennant as Lady Vivian
 Mark Lewis Jones as King Olaf
 Kevin Eldon as Trickler
 Joseph Mawle as Alvarr
 Emily Beecham as Enmyria
 John Lynch as Balinor

Episodes

References

2009 British television seasons
Merlin (2008 TV series)